Shoegaze (originally called shoegazing and sometimes conflated with "dream pop") is a subgenre of indie and alternative rock characterized by its ethereal mixture of obscured vocals, guitar distortion and effects, feedback, and overwhelming volume. It emerged in Ireland and the United Kingdom in the late 1980s among neo-psychedelic groups who usually stood motionless during live performances in a detached, non-confrontational state. The name comes from the heavy use of effects pedals, as the performers were often looking down at their pedals during concerts.

My Bloody Valentine's album Loveless (1991) is often seen as the genre's defining release; other prominent shoegaze groups include Slowdive, Ride, Lush, Pale Saints, Airiel, and Chapterhouse. A loose label given to the shoegaze bands and other affiliated bands in London in the early 1990s was "the Scene That Celebrates Itself". Most shoegaze artists drew from the template set by My Bloody Valentine on their late 1980s recordings, as well as bands such as The Jesus and Mary Chain and Cocteau Twins.

In the early 1990s shoegaze was pushed aside by the American grunge movement and early Britpop acts, forcing the relatively unknown bands to break up or reinvent their style altogether. Since the late 2010s, a renewed interest in the genre has been noted, namely among nu gaze and blackgaze bands.

Characteristics

Shoegaze combines ethereal, swirling vocals with layers of distorted, bent, or flanged guitars, creating a wash of sound where no instrument is distinguishable from another. The genre was typically "overwhelmingly loud, with long, droning riffs, waves of distortion, and cascades of feedback. Vocals and melodies disappeared into the walls of guitars."

Etymology

The term "shoegazing" originated in a concert review in Sounds for the newly formed band Moose, in which singer Russell Yates read lyrics taped to the floor throughout the gig. The term was picked up by NME, who used it as a reference to the tendency of the bands' guitarists to stare at their feet — or their effects pedals — while playing, seemingly deep in concentration.

According to AllMusic: "The shatteringly loud, droning neo-psychedelia the band performed was dubbed shoegaze by the British press because the band members stared at the stage while they performed". The term was also used by the British music press to describe dream pop bands. Slowdive's Simon Scott found the term relevant:

However, to some, the term was considered a pejorative, especially by a part of the English weekly music press who considered the movement as ineffectual, and it was disliked by many of the groups it purported to describe. Lush's singer Miki Berenyi explained:  Ride's Mark Gardener had another take on his group's static presentation: "We didn't want to use the stage as a platform for ego... We presented ourselves as normal people, as a band who wanted their fans to think they could do that too."

History

Origins and precursors

According to AllMusic, most bands drew from the music of My Bloody Valentine as a template for the genre, as well as groups such as Cocteau Twins and The Jesus and Mary Chain. British duo A.R. Kane have also been credited with producing a template for the genre in the late 1980s. My Bloody Valentine's Loveless is often referred to as the greatest album the genre has produced. Each band's music bridged the styles of garage rock, 1960s psychedelia and American indie bands like Dinosaur Jr. and Sonic Youth. Other artists that have been identified as direct influences on shoegaze include the Velvet Underground, Hüsker Dü, and The Cure. Siouxsie and the Banshees was also a major influence initially on Cocteau Twins. Slowdive named themselves after the Siouxsie and the Banshees song of the same name and took inspiration from the group at their beginnings. Lush, a shoegaze contemporary, were originally called "The Baby Machines", a line from a Siouxsie lyric. Other bands who have been cited as exploring proto-shoegaze sounds and textures include Spacemen 3 and the House of Love.

My Bloody Valentine emerged in the wake of their 1988 breakthrough with the "You Made Me Realise" EP and album Isn't Anything. The Trouser Press Guide to '90s Rock mentions that "A.R. Kane, the London duo... (who dubbed their music 'dream pop') exerted a profound sonic influence on the legion of trippy shoegazer guitar bands that would emerge a few years later in the UK". Michael Azerrad's book Our Band Could Be Your Life cited an early 1990s Dinosaur Jr. tour of the United Kingdom as a key influence.

Whereas contemporary alternative rock movements of the time period were extremely male-dominated (Britpop, grunge), My Bloody Valentine, Slowdive, Lush, Cocteau Twins, Pale Saints, and many other popular shoegaze acts had at least one prominent female musician who contributed key vocal elements and/or integral writing components to the music. In the 2014 film Beautiful Noise, Kevin Shields noted that there were as many women as men in the shoegaze community.

The Scene That Celebrates Itself
The Scene That Celebrates Itself was the social and musical scene in the early 1990s within London and the Thames Valley area. The term was coined by Melody Maker's Steve Sutherland in 1990 in a near-contemptuous gesture, focusing on how bands involved in the scene, rather than engaging in traditional rivalries, were often seen at each other's gigs, sometimes playing in each other's bands, and drinking together.

Bands lumped into the 'scene' by the press included several of the bands that were branded with the shoegazing label, such as Chapterhouse, Lush, Moose and other (mainly indie) bands such as Blur (prior to the release of their single "Popscene"), Thousand Yard Stare, See See Rider and Stereolab. A prime example were Moose, who often swapped members with other bands on a given night. Moose's Russell Yates and Stereolab guitarist Tim Gane would often trade places, while "Moose" McKillop often played with See See Rider. Gane and his Stereolab colleague Lætitia Sadier even played on the 1991 session by Moose for John Peel's BBC Radio 1 show.

The bands, producers and journalists of the time would gather in London and their activities would be chronicled in the gossip pages of the music papers NME and Melody Maker. The most famous club and focal point was Syndrome, which was located on Oxford Street and ran weekly on Wednesday nights. The NME, in particular, embraced the scene, and the unity of the bands was probably advantageous to their careers, because when one band had a successful record, the other bands could share the publicity. The scene was extremely small and revolved around fewer than 20 individuals.

The first stirrings of recognition came when indie writer Steve Lamacq referred to Ride in an NME review as "the House of Love with chainsaws".

The shoegaze genre label was quite often misapplied. As key bands such as Slowdive, Chapterhouse and Ride emerged from the Thames Valley, Swervedriver found themselves labelled shoegazers on account of their own Thames Valley origins, despite their more pronounced Hüsker Dü-meets-Stooges stylings.

Decline
The coining of the term "The Scene That Celebrates Itself" was in many ways the beginning of the end for the first wave of shoegazers. The bands became perceived by critics as over-privileged, self-indulgent, and middle-class. This perception was in sharp contrast with both the bands who formed the wave of newly commercialized grunge music which was making its way across the Atlantic, as well as those bands who formed the foundation of Britpop, such as Pulp, Oasis, Blur and Suede. Britpop also offered intelligible lyrics, often about the trials and tribulations of working-class life; this was a stark contrast to the "vocals as an instrument" approach of shoegaze, which often prized the melodic contribution of vocals over their lyrical depth.

Many shoegaze bands would either disband or change their sound during the mid-1990s. Ride disbanded before the release of their fourth album, Tarantula, which would shift to a more contemporary alternative rock sound. Slowdive's third album, Pygmalion, would shift to a more experimental sound that was stylistically closer to post-rock than shoegaze. Slowdive would be dropped from Creation Records just a week after Pygmalion's release, and Tarantula would also be deleted from their catalogue a week after its release.

Lush's final album, Lovelife, was an abrupt shift from shoegaze to Britpop, which alienated many fans; the 1996 suicide of their drummer signaled Lush's dissolution. Following a long gap from My Bloody Valentine since Loveless, aside from their 2008 reunion tour, the band released m b v in February 2013. Shields explained their silence by noting, "I never could be bothered to make another record unless I was really excited by it."

Post-movement directions

Several former members of shoegaze bands later moved towards dream pop, post-rock, and the more electronica-based trip hop. Neil Halstead, Rachel Goswell, and Ian McCutcheon of Slowdive would form Mojave 3, while guitarist Christian Savill would form Monster Movie. Adam Franklin of Swervedriver released lo-fi albums under the moniker Toshack Highway. The use of electronic dance and ambient elements by bands such as Slowdive and Seefeel paved the way for later developments in post-rock and electronica.

While shoegaze briefly flared and then faded out in the UK, the bands of the initial wave had an immense impact on the development of regional underground and college rock scenes in the US. In particular, a Lush and Ride tour of the US in 1991 directly inspired the spawning of American shoegaze groups including Drop Nineteens, Half String and Ozean. Columnist Emma Sailor of KRUI in Iowa City opines:

About DC-based Velocity Girl's 1991 single "My Forgotten Favorite", Sailor goes on to note, "Could anything be more different — and yet so similar — to [Slowdive]? The hazy [production] and dreamy, high pitched female vocals are there, but the outlook is entirely different." Other notable American shoegaze influenced bands of the early-to mid-1990s included Lilys, Swirlies, The Veldt, and Medicine.

A resurgence of the genre began in the late 1990s (particularly in the United States) and the early 2000s, that helped usher in what is now referred to as the "nu gaze" era. Also various heavy metal acts were inspired by shoegaze, which contributed to the emergence of "post-metal" and "metalgaze" styles. Particularly in the mid-2000s, French black metal acts Alcest and Amesoeurs began incorporating shoegaze elements into their sound, pioneering the blackgaze genre.

In eastern Asia the genre has become increasingly popular with bands such as Cocteau Twins influencing the creation of new "art school" shoegaze. Bands like Tokyo Shoegazer and For Tracy Hyde have increasingly adopted western elements, with some bands combining Indie music with shoegaze and psychedelic rock. Further, since the late 2010s, some artists began prominently incorporating emo themes into shoegaze, with albums like Weatherdays Come In (2019) and Parannouls To See the Next Part of the Dream (2021) being examples.

See also

 Beautiful Noise (film)
 List of shoegaze musicians

References

External links

 
1990s neologisms
British rock music genres
British styles of music
Neo-psychedelia